Safiya Abdel Rahman was a notable member of the Egyptian Federation for Scouts and Girl Guides and was extremely active in sports for girls in Egypt. She was a recipient of the Silver Fish Award in 1965.

References

Girl Guiding and Girl Scouting
Scouting and Guiding in Egypt
Recipients of the Silver Fish Award